I Can Has Cheezburger? (abbreviated as ICHC) is a blog-format website featuring videos (usually involving animals) and image macros. It was created in 2007 by Eric Nakagawa (Cheezburger), from Hawaii, and his friend Kari Unebasami (Tofuburger). The website was one of the most popular Internet sites of its kind receiving as many as 1,500,000 hits per day at its peak in May 2007.  ICHC was instrumental in bringing animal-based image macros and lolspeak into mainstream usage and making Internet memes profitable.

ICHC was created on January 11, 2007, when Nakagawa posted an image from comedy website Something Awful of a smiling British Shorthair cat, known as Happycat, with a caption of the animal asking, "I can has cheezburger?" in a style popularised by 4chan. It is from this image that the site derives its name. After posting similar images, Nakagawa then converted the site to a monetized blog.

A group of investors acquired the website in September 2007 for US$2 million. The blog became the flagship site of the Cheezburger Network, led by Ben Huh. The network also includes FAIL Blog and Know Your Meme. In 2016 the network was acquired by Literally Media.

Content 
ICHC's content is submitted by the site's readers, and the site hosts "the LOL Builder", an image macro creation tool. The number of submissions has risen dramatically with the growth of the site. In July 2007, ICHC received as many as 500 submissions per day. By January 2008, the average was 8000. Only about a dozen or so submissions per day are posted to the website, while updates are timed to coincide with when readers are most likely to be visiting the site – morning, lunchtime and evenings. , ICHC gets about 2 million page views per day.

The site attempts to maintain a community feel, encouraging interactivity with readers via a voting system where users can rate an image from one to five "cheezburgers", and through themes as one image will attract responses to form a continuous narrative. According to Nakagawa, "It's like you're creating a story supplied by people in the community, and then the people in the community supply the next part of the story." Until 2013, ICHC also ran a wiki at SpeakLolSpeak.com designed to be a collection of important lolspeak phrases.

Popular trends on the ICHC website for captioning have included "ceiling cat" (usually a white cat); "basement cat" (a black cat); the "itteh bitteh kitteh committeh"; invisible [something]; the Lolrus and his "bukkit"; fail (now moved to FAIL Blog); "om nom nom" (as in eating sounds); references to "cheezburgers"; "happy caturday"; "monorail kitteh"; "oh hai"; and "kthxbai" ("OK, thanks, goodbye"). ICHC has popularized snowclones such as "I'm in your (noun), (verb ending in ing) your (noun)"; " [some activity or emotion], ur doin it right/wrong"; and "I gave/brought you [something] but I eated it/uzed it all up".

Fonts
The typeface Impact is used in almost every picture on all the I Can Has Cheezburger websites (though not as much on its subsidiary websites, such as Memebase), and has even gone as far as to be attempted to be replicated in an oil painting representation of the original "Happy cat" (the original lolcat to say "I Can Has Cheezburger?") on the ICHC website. This use of the font stems from it being the font of choice in Something Awful image macros for many hence it is the default font in the site's Lolcat Builder. Many people creating lolcats in other software have used the same font to retain the classic I Can Has Cheezburger look. Other standard fonts are available on the builder.

Spin-off projects and publications
A network of related sister sites has developed alongside ICHC, called the Cheezburger Network. 25 of these are linked to each other via a navigation bar at the top of each site. LOLwork on Bravo chronicled employees lives at the ICHC office.

ICHC produced a book, I Can Has Cheezburger?: A LOLcat Colleckshun, in 2008. A second ICHC book, How To Take Over The Wurld: An LOLcat Guide 2 Winning, was published in 2009. Also, FAIL Blog released its first book, Fail Nation: A Visual Romp Through the World of Epic Fails, on October 6, 2009.

Cheezburger was the subject of the LOLwork reality television series on the Bravo television network. The series followed Ben Huh and his staff as they created new content for the site.

#ICanHazPDF, derived from I Can Has Cheezburger?, is a hashtag used on Twitter by researchers seeking academic papers for free to get around academic journals' paywalls.

See also

 Pet Holdings – the company that originally owned the Cheezburger Network
 Fail Blog
 Failbook
 Know Your Meme
 List of Internet phenomena
 Texts From Last Night

References

External links
 

American comedy websites
Internet humor
Internet properties established in 2007
Internet memes
Companies based in Seattle
Animal websites